Reid is a surname of Scottish origin. It means "red".

People with the surname
 Alan Reid (disambiguation)
 Alex Reid (disambiguation), includes Alexander Reid
 Amanda Reid, Australian Paralympic athlete
 Amanda Reid (taxonomist), Australian biologist
 Amy Sanderson née Reid (1876–1931), Scottish suffragette
 Andy Reid (disambiguation), includes Andrew Reid 
 Angella Reid, White House Chief Usher
 Anthony Reid (academic) (born 1939), historian of Southeast Asia
 Antonio Reid, record executive
 Arizona Reid (born 1986), Israeli National League basketball player
 Beverly W. Reid (1917–1942), United States Navy officer, pilot, and Navy Cross recipient
 Bevis Reid (1919–1997), British athlete
 Billy Reid (disambiguation)
 Brandon Reid (born 1981), ice hockey player for the Vancouver Canucks
 Bruce Reid (born 1963), Australian cricketer
 Bruce Reid (disambiguation)
 Buddy Reid (born 1940), Sri Lankan cricketer
 Carl Reid, Canadian Roman Catholic priest
 Carolyn Reid (born 1972), English field hockey goalkeeper
 Charles Reid (disambiguation)
 Charlie Reid (disambiguation)
 Charlie and Craig Reid, members of The Proclaimers
 Chris Reid (born 1971), Scottish footballer
 Christopher Reid (born 1949), British poet, essayist and writer
 Christopher Reid (entertainer), aka "Kid" Reid, American actor and rapper
 Christopher Reid (swimmer) (born 1996), South African competitor 2016 Olympics
 Clarence Reid (1939–2016), American musician, songwriter, and record producer, also known as Blowfly 
 Cliff Reid (1891–1959), American film producer 
 Constance Reid (1918–2010), mathematical author
 Cornelius L. Reid (1911–2008), American voice teacher and writer on singing
 Dallas Reid (born 1993), American voice actor
 Daniel G. Reid (1858 – 1925), American industrialist, financier, and philanthropist
 Damion Reid (born 1979), American drummer 
 Daphne Reid, American actress
 Darren Reid (born 1983), Canadian ice hockey player
 David Reid (disambiguation)
 Derek Reid (1927–2006), British mycologist
 Don Reid (disambiguation)
 Doug Reid (cricketer) (born 1928), New Zealand cricketer
 Duke Reid (1915–1975), Jamaican record producer
 Duncan Reid (born 1989), Hong Kong basketball player
 Edward Waymouth Reid (1862–1948), British physiologist
 Eliza Reid (born 1976), Canadian-born writer and editor; First Lady of Iceland
 Elliott Reid (1920-2013), American actor
 Ellis Vair Reid (1889–1917), Canadian World War I pilot
 Escott Reid (1905–1999), Canadian public servant and diplomat
 Elizabeth Reid (disambiguation)
 Elizabeth Jesser Reid (1789–1866), British social reformer and founder of Bedford College
 Fiona Reid (born 1951), Canadian actress
 Forrest Reid (1875–1947), British novelist
 Frances Reid (1914–2010), American daytime television actress
 Francis Reid (1900–1970), British army officer
 Frank H. Reid (1844 or 1850–1898), American soldier, teacher, engineer, and surveyor
 Frank Reid (disambiguation) 
 Geordie Reid, Scottish footballer 
 George Reid (disambiguation) 
 George Reid (1845–1918), fourth Prime Minister of Australia
 George Reid (Scottish politician) (born 1939), Scottish politician
 George Croghan Reid (1876–1961), American Medal of Honor recipient
 Gordon Reid (disambiguation) 
 Gordon Reid (actor) (1939–2003), Scottish actor
 Gordon Reid (governor) (1923–1989), former Governor of Western Australia
 Harry Reid (1939–2021), Nevada Senator and Senate Minority Leader
 Harry Reid (disambiguation)
 Harry Fielding Reid (1859–1944), American geophysicist
 Helen Rogers Reid (1882–1970), American publisher
 Henry Reid, UCLA employee involved in human tissue scandal
 Hugo Reid (1809–1852), Scottish-born early California settler
 Iain Reid (born  1980), Canadian writer
 J. S. Reid (James Smith Reid, c. 1848–1922) Australian newspaper, mining and railways businessman 
 James Reid (disambiguation)
 Jamie Reid (born 1947), British artist and anarchist
 Jamie Reid (disambiguation)
 Janice Reid (born 1947), Australian academic and medical anthropologist
 Jen Reid, subject of Mark Quinn's sculpture A Surge of Power (Jen Reid) 2020
 Jim Reid (born 1961), musician, lead singer of The Jesus and Mary Chain
 Joanne Reid (born 1992), American biathlete
 John Reid (disambiguation), multiple people
 John Reid, Baron Reid of Cardowan, British politician
 Joseph L. Reid (1923–2015), American oceanographer
 Justin Reid (born 1997), American football player
 Kerry Reid (born 1947), Australian tennis player
 Laurie Reid (born 1964), American artist
 Lawrence A. Reid, American linguist
 Linda Reid (born 1959), Canadian politician
 Lucien Reid (born 1993), British boxer
 Lydia Reid, American politician
 Lydia Reid (activist), activist for families with children who died as infants
 Malcolm Reid (1857–1933), timber merchant and furniture retailer in South Australia
 Margaret Reid (disambiguation)
 Marion Reid (born 1929), Canadian provincial politician
 Matt Reid (baseball), American college baseball coach
 Matthew Reid (disambiguation)
 Meta Mayne Reid (1905–1991), British children's writer
 Mike Reid (disambiguation), includes Michael Reid
 Mike Reid (actor) (1940–2007), British actor and comedian
 Mike Reid (golfer) (born 1954), Canadian golfer
 Miles Reid (born 1948), mathematician
 Naz Reid (born 1999), American basketball player
 Neil Reid (disambiguation), several people
 Nicholas Reid (disambiguation)
 Ogden Mills Reid (1882–1947), American publisher
 Ogden Rogers Reid (1925–2019), American diplomat and politician
 Patrick Reid (disambiguation)
 Peter Reid (born 1956), English football manager
 Pierre Reid (1948–2021), Canadian politician
 Rebecca Reid, British actress
 Reuben Reid (born 1988), British football (soccer) player
 Richard Reid (born 1973), British jihadist best known as the "shoe bomber"
 Richard Reid (disambiguation) includes Richie Reid
 Riley Reid (born 1991), American pornographic actress
 Robert Reid (disambiguation)
 Robert Gillespie Reid (1842–1908), Scottish railway contractor
 Robert James Reid (born 1931), American lineman
 Robert Reid (painter) (1862–1929), American impressionist painter
 Robert Threshie Reid, 1st Earl of Loreburn, British Liberal politician
 Ross Reid (politician) (born 1952), Canadian politician
 Ross T. Reid (1832–1915), Australian pastoralist
 Rufus Reid (born 1944), American jazz bassist and educator
 Russell Reid, British psychiatrist
 Sally Reid, Scottish actress
 Samantha Reid (1984–1999), American high school student and manslaughter victim
 Samuel Reid (disambiguation)
 Scott Reid (political advisor), advisor to Canadian Prime Minister Paul Martin
 Scott Reid (politician) (born 1964), Conservative Party of Canada MP
 Sean Reid-Foley (born 1995), American baseball player
 Squire Reid (1887–1949), Australian politician
 Stefen Reid (born 1972), Canadian football player
 Steven Reid (born 1981), Irish football (soccer) player
 Sue Reid (born 1970), Canadian field hockey player
 Susan Reid, birth name of Hilda Koronel (born 1957), Filipino actress
 Susanna Reid (born 1970), English journalist and television presenter 
 T.R. Reid, American journalist, author and documentary film correspondent
 Tara Reid (born 1975), American actress
 Tasha Reid (born 1981), Korean rapper
 Thomas Reid (1710–1796), Scottish common-sense philosopher
 Thomas Reid (disambiguation)
 Thomas Mayne Reid (1818–1883), Irish-American novelist
 Tim Reid (born 1944), American actor and film director
 Tim Reid (politician) (born 1936) Canadian politician
 Vernon Reid (born 1958), guitarist of the band Living Colour
 Victor Stafford Reid (1913–1987), Jamaican writer
 Virginia Reid (1916–1955), first stage name of actress better known as Lynne Carver
 Wallace Reid (1891–1923), silent film actor
 William Reid (disambiguation)
 Whitelaw Reid (1837–1912), American diplomat, politician, and journalist
 Whitelaw Reid (journalist) (1913–2009), American journalist and publisher
 Wilfrid Thomas Reid (1887–1968), English aircraft designer and Canadian aviation pioneer

Fictional characters
 Britt Reid, secret identity of the Green Hornet
 Elliot Reid a character on the TV show Scrubs
 Emma Reid, a character on the British soap opera Doctors
 F. X. Reid, pseudonym used by a British computer science writer
 John Reid, better known as the Lone Ranger
 Spencer Reid, a character on the TV show Criminal Minds
Diana Reid, his mother
William Reid, his father
 Jonathan Reid, a character in the Vampyr video game
 Fergus Reid, a character in multiple titles in the Wolfenstein video game series
 Ashleigh Reid, a playable character known as Ash in Apex Legends

See also 
Reed (name)
Reid (disambiguation)
Reidy
Riedy

References

Scottish surnames
English-language surnames
Surnames from nicknames